The 1924 South Carolina United States Senate election was held on November 4, 1924, to select the U.S. Senator for a six-year term from the state of South Carolina.  Coleman Livingston Blease won the Democratic primary and was unopposed in the general election to win the six-year term to the Senate.

Democratic primary

Candidates
Coleman Livingston Blease, former Governor of South Carolina and candidate for U.S. Senate in 1914 and 1918
James F. Byrnes, U.S. Representative from Charleston
Nathaniel B. Dial, incumbent Senator since 1919
John McMahan

Results

General election

Results

|-
| 
| colspan=5 |Democratic hold
|-

See also
List of United States senators from South Carolina
1924 United States Senate elections
1924 United States House of Representatives elections in South Carolina
1924 South Carolina gubernatorial election

References

"Report of the Secretary of State to the General Assembly of South Carolina.  Part II." Reports of State Officers Boards and Committees to the General Assembly of the State of South Carolina. Volume I. Columbia, SC: 1925, p. 59.

South Carolina
1924
1924 South Carolina elections
1924 United States Senate election in South Carolina